Bikram Singh Majithia (born 1 March 1975) is an Indian politician and a former cabinet minister in the Punjab Government. He won 2007 Punjab Vidhan Sabha elections from the Majitha constituency, and again won in 2012 and 2017. He belongs to Shiromani Akali Dal and is president of its Youth Wing, Youth Akali Dal.

Background and family
Majithia was born on 1 March 1975 to former Deputy Defence Minister Satyajit Singh Majithia and Sukhmanjus Kaur Majithia in Delhi. He was educated at the Lawrence School Sanawar. His grandfather Sardar Surjit Singh Majithia was a Wing Commander in the Indian Air Force and his great-grandfather Sir Sundar Singh Majithia was Revenue Minister in the Punjab government. He is the younger brother of Bathinda MP, Harsimrat Kaur Badal and brother-in-law of former Deputy Chief Minister of Punjab, Sukhbir Singh Badal. Bikram married Ganieve Kaur in November 2009 and they have two sons.

Political career
He first won the Punjab Vidhan Sabha elections from the Majitha constituency in 2007. He won again from the same constituency in 2012 and 2017 assembly elections. Subsequently he was inducted into the Punjab Cabinet. He is ex minister of Revenue, Rehabilitation and Disaster Management, Information & Public Relations and Non Conventional Energy.

In February 2022, Majithia surrendered before a Mohali court in the drug case registered against him in December 2021, and was remanded in judicial custody till 8 March. While his wife Ganieve contested from Majitha constituency in the 2022 Punjab Legislative Assembly election and won, Majithia instead contested from Amritsar East, and lost.

He is imprisoned in Patiala Jail along with his rival Congress leader Navjot Singh Sidhu against whom Majithia contested the 2022 Punjab Assembly elections.

On 10 August 2022, the Punjab and Haryana High Court granted bail to Majithia.

Electoral performance

See also
 Majithia Sirdars

References

External links 
 Bikram Singh Majithia on Facebook

1975 births
Living people
Shiromani Akali Dal politicians
State cabinet ministers of Punjab, India
Place of birth missing (living people)
Punjab, India MLAs 2012–2017
People from Amritsar district
Punjab, India MLAs 2017–2022
Indian politicians convicted of crimes